The Newark Bears were an American minor league professional baseball team based in Newark, New Jersey.  They were a member of the Atlantic League of Professional Baseball and, later, the Canadian American Association of Professional Baseball. The Bears played their home games at Bears & Eagles Riverfront Stadium. The team folded after the 2013 season.

History of Newark baseball

Newark was the home of several former minor league baseball teams, from the formation of the Newark Indians in 1902 and the addition of the Newark Eagles of the Negro National League in 1936. A Federal League team, the Newark Peppers, also played in 1915.

The original Newark Bears were a team in the International League from 1926 to 1949.  They played their home games at the former Ruppert Stadium in what is now known as the Ironbound section of Newark.

The Bears of the Atlantic League

The Newark Bears are named for the former Newark Bears team of the International League.  The new team was formed in 1998 by former New York Yankees catcher Rick Cerone, a Newark native. However, the Bears played their "home" schedule at The Ballpark at Harbor Yard in Bridgeport, Connecticut that season while awaiting the completion of their new home field. In addition, the Bears played several home games during the first half of the 1999 season at Skylands Park in Augusta. The Bears inaugurated their new park, Bears & Eagles Riverfront Stadium, in Newark on July 16, 1999.

Over the years, the Bears attracted star talent to their club.  Ozzie Canseco played for the Bears in 2000 and 2001, and his brother José Canseco was with the team for part of 2001 as well.  Rickey Henderson played the first half of the 2003 season with the Bears and was named Most Valuable Player in the Atlantic League All-Star Game. He was subsequently signed by the Los Angeles Dodgers but was released at season's end, and he returned to the Bears for 2004. Also in 2003, José Lima pitched for the Bears at the beginning of the season; after the Kansas City Royals signed him away from Newark, Lima won his first seven decisions for the Royals.

Other notable alumni include Scott Spiezio, Edgardo Alfonzo, Armando Benítez, Carl Everett, Ramiro Mendoza, Scott Williamson, Keith Foulke, Jay Gibbons, Jim Leyritz, Daryle Ward  and Lance Johnson.

Rescue from bankruptcy and possible demise

The Newark Bears, under former owner Marc Berson, filed Chapter 11 bankruptcy on October 24, 2008.  The team's existence was almost compromised until the Bases Loaded Group, LLC purchased the team, guaranteeing a $1 million line of credit to the Atlantic League.   The Bases Loaded Group consisted of executives from Philadelphia and New Jersey, some hailing from Newark.  The primary leader of the group was Tom Cetnar, former General Manager of the Bears in 2001. He served as president and was a member of the ownership group.

Move to the Can-Am League

The Newark Bears joined the Canadian American Association of Professional Baseball on October 6, 2010. The Bears were one of three teams to join the league for the 2011 season, with the traveling New York Federals and the expansion Rockland Boulders. Newark was originally to be one of three cities to represent New Jersey in the Can-Am League along with Little Falls, home of the New Jersey Jackals, and Augusta, home of the Sussex Skyhawks. The Skyhawks, however, elected to stop operating after the 2010 season.

In 2010, the Newark Bears were purchased by New Jersey radiologist Dr. Douglas Spiel and his partner, Danielle Dronet.

The Can-Am League announced on November 28, 2013, that the Newark Bears would not operate in 2014, with the remaining four teams now a division in the American Association.  An auction for the team's assets was held on April 26, 2014.

Logos and uniforms

The Newark Bears went through three phases of logos and uniform colors.  When the franchise began, it had a purple, black and white color scheme.  In the mid-2000s, the team went to red, black, and white.  When the club ceased operations, its colors were navy blue and white.  The primary logo consisted of a stylized bear holding a baseball bat superimposed over a depiction of the Newark skyline over a baseball diamond.  The "Newark Bears" wordmark was centered at the base of the logo and included white accents and a black outline.

The Bears' uniforms were traditional in design.  The home cap was navy blue throughout with a white block "N"  centered on the front.  The home jerseys were white with traditional navy blue pinstripes.  A navy blue, block "N" was prominently displayed on the left breast. The road jersey was gray with the cursive "Newark" wordmark in navy blue, centered diagonally across the front.  Both home and away jersey sleeves sported the Bears' primary logo.  The Bears wore navy blue belts and socks with all uniforms.

Season-by-season records

 2 Atlantic League Championships (2002, 2007)

Rivalries

Shortly after the Newark Bears joined the Can-Am League, they announced a formal rivalry with the New Jersey Jackals.  Since both teams played in Essex County, they established the County Executives' Cup to formalize this geographical contest.

Radio

Bears games were aired on WSOU-FM 89.5 from 1999 to 2003, and again from 2007 to 2008. Previous announcers for the team include Seton Hall color commentator Dave Popkin, former WNEW-FM disc jockey Jim Monaghan, MLB Network host Victor Rojas, Somerset Patriots announcer Brian Bender, former New York Islanders broadcaster Jim Cerny, Jason Page, Ray Alexander, and Erie Otters broadcaster Paul Roper.  In 2009, longtime New York sportscaster Spencer Ross served as both radio broadcaster and team on-field MC.

Mascots

The Newark Bears' official mascots were anthropomorphic bears named Ruppert and Effa.  They wore the team's home jersey and cap.  Ruppert was named after Jacob Ruppert, who owned the former Newark Bears team in the 1930s.  Effa alludes to Effa Manley, the first woman to own and operate a professional baseball team (the Newark Eagles) and the only female member of the National Baseball Hall of Fame.

Retired numbers 

 21 (Roberto Clemente) OF, retired in 2009
 42 (Jackie Robinson) 2B, retired throughout professional baseball on April 15, 1997
1 (Quentin Davis) OF, retired in 2012

Notable former players
 Edgardo Alfonzo
 Armando Benítez
 José Canseco
 Ozzie Canseco
 Ramón Castro
 Carl Everett
 Jay Gibbons
 Rickey Henderson
 José Herrera
 Bobby Hill
 Doug Jennings
 Danny Kanell
 Steve Kent
 Al Levine 
 Jim Leyritz
 José Lima
 Rob Mackowiak
 Rubén Mateo
 Hensley Meulens
 Tim Raines Jr.
 Jeriome Robertson
 Randall Simon
 Phil Weintraub

See also
Sports in Newark, New Jersey

References

External links 
 

 
Canadian American Association of Professional Baseball teams
Sports in Newark, New Jersey
Professional baseball teams in New Jersey
Baseball teams in the New York metropolitan area
Defunct Atlantic League of Professional Baseball teams
Defunct baseball teams in New Jersey
1998 establishments in New Jersey
Baseball teams established in 1998
Sports clubs disestablished in 2013
Former Atlantic League of Professional Baseball teams
2013 disestablishments in New Jersey
Defunct independent baseball league teams
Baseball teams disestablished in 2013